Vanam Vari Krishnapuram is an Indian village in Mudigonda mandal, Khammam district in the Indian state of Telangana.

Geography 
It is located 23 km from Khammam, the headquarters of the Khammam District of Andhra Pradesh, India.

Vanam Vari Krishnapuram is located along the Khammam-Vallabi main road.

Agriculture 
Agriculture is the main occupation for villagers. The most common crops are rice, cotton and chilli. Other commercial crops such as white popinac and sugarcane, as well as mango and coconut plantations have flourished.

Water for agriculture is primarily drawn from Nagarjuna Sagar Dam's left canal (a.k.a. Lal Bahadur Shastri Canal)/N.S Canal which flows through the village. Other sources are wells and Vanam Vari Krishnapuram Cheruvu which draws water from N.S Canal.

Transport 
The village is located on one of the major routes in Mudigonda Mandal.,

APSRTC buses to Vallabhi/Pedamandava/Vallapuram run through the village.

References 

Villages in Khammam district